721 Tabora is a minor planet orbiting the Sun. Tabora was named at a conference in Hamburg, Germany in 1913. The name was chosen because the conference was held aboard the passenger cargo liner  of the Deutsche Ost-Afrika Linie.

This is a low albedo D-type asteroid showing the characteristic featureless, reddish spectrum of that taxonomic class. It spans a girth of approximately 76 km.

References

External links
 
 

Cybele asteroids
19111018
D-type asteroids (Tholen)
Tabora
Tabora